Wolf-Ferrari:
 Ermanno Wolf-Ferrari, born: Ermanno Wolf (1876, Venice - 1948, Venice), an Italian composer and teacher
 List of operas by Wolf-Ferrari
 Manno Wolf-Ferrari (1911–1994), an Italian conductor, and a nephew of Ermanno
 Teodoro Wolf Ferrari (1878 – 1945), Italian painter

See also 
 Wolf (name)
 Ferrari (disambiguation)

German-language surnames
Italian-language surnames
Compound surnames